Christine Marie may refer to:
 Christine of France (Christine Marie, 1606–1663), sister of Louis XIII and the Duchess of Savoy by marriage
 Christine Marie Berkhout, Dutch biologist
 Christine Marie Cabanos, American voice actress